Otto Pius Hippius (Saint Petersburg — , Saint Petersburg) was a Baltic German architect, particularly noted for several buildings in present-day Estonia.

Life and works
Otto Hippius was born to the painter and lithographer, Gustav Adolf Hippius, who taught his son art at a very early age. As a teenager, Otto Hippius studied in Germany and, in 1849, he graduated with honors from Karlsruhe Institute of Technology. From 1849 to 1851 he studied at the Imperial Academy of Arts in Saint Petersburg. Upon graduation, he worked as an architect and teacher at several art schools. In 1864 Hippius became a member of the Russian Academy of Sciences and in 1879 he became a professor.

Among his works are Sagnitz Manor (now in Sangaste) in southern Estonia, built for Count Friedrich Wilhelm Rembert von Berg between 1879 and 1883; Münkenhof Manor (now in Muuga), built for the painter Carl Timoleon von Neff between 1866 and 1873; Charles' Church in Reval (now Tallinn), constructed between 1862 and 1870; and Alexander Church (et) in Narva, constructed between 1881 and 1884.

See also
List of Baltic German architects

References

1826 births
1883 deaths
Architects from Saint Petersburg
People from Sankt-Peterburgsky Uyezd
Baltic-German people
Architects from the Russian Empire
19th-century Estonian people
Estonian architects